Damping is an influence within or upon an oscillatory system that has the effect of reducing or preventing its oscillation.

Damping may also refer to:

 Damping factor
 Damping (music)
 Damping torque
 Damping capacitor
 Damping matrix
 Damping off